The Korteweg-de Vries Institute for Mathematics (KdVI) is the institute for mathematical research at the University of Amsterdam. The KdVI is located in Amsterdam at the Amsterdam Science Park.

Robbert Dijkgraaf, Alexander Schrijver, Nicolai Reshetikhin, Jacob Korevaar, Miranda Cheng, Harry Buhrman and Jan van de Craats are notable researchers connected to the institute. The KdVI is an institutional member of the Royal Dutch Mathematical Society and the European Mathematical Society.

Research
Among the core research directions of the KdVI are:
Algebraic geometry, prof.dr. Lenny Taelman
Representation theory, Lie theory and algebraic groups, prof.dr. Jasper Stokman and prof.dr. Eric Opdam
Theoretical physics and mathematical physics, prof.dr. Sergey Shadrin
Discrete mathematics, algebraic combinatorics and graph theory, prof.dr. Jo Ellis-Monaghan
Pure analysis and dynamical systems, prof.dr. Han Peters 
Numerical analysis and applied analysis, prof.dr. Rob Stevenson
Mathematical statistics and machine learning, prof.dr. Joris Mooij
Probability theory and queueing theory, prof.dr. Michel Mandjes
History of mathematics, dr. Gerard Alberts
Didactics, dr. André Heck
The institute is involved in several interdisciplinary research collaborations, including The Amsterdam String Theory Group, the NETWORKS programme and the QuSoft research center for quantum software

Education
Besides its research activities, the KdVI runs the education programmes in mathematics at the University of Amsterdam, namely the bachelor programme Mathematics and the master programmes Mathematics and Stochastics and Financial Mathematics, and jointly organises interdisciplinary double bachelor programmes Mathematics and Physics and Mathematics and Computer Science.

Name
The institute is named after the mathematicians Diederik Johannes Korteweg and Gustav de Vries. Korteweg was professor of mathematics at the University of Amsterdam from 1881 to 1918, and De Vries was Korteweg's student. Together they worked on the Korteweg–de Vries equation.

Directors

See also 
 Centrum Wiskunde & Informatica
 Institute for Logic, Language and Computation

References

External links 
 Official Site

Amsterdam-Oost
Organisations based in Amsterdam
Mathematical institutes
Research institutes in the Netherlands
University of Amsterdam